Bridelia stipularis is a perennial evergreen climber grows over hedges and bushes and sometimes on bigger trees. It is native to Southeast Asia, southern China, and the Indian subcontinent. Used as medicines in Malaysia and the Philippines. Bridelia stipularis, as other Bridelia species, used as food plants by the larvae of some Lepidoptera species including Endoclita malabaricus.

References

External links
 Pictures
 
 

stipularis
Flora of Asia
Medicinal plants
Plants described in 1776